The 1903 Washington Agricultural football team was an American football team that represented Washington Agricultural College during the 1903 college football season. The team competed as an independent under head coach James N. Ashmore and compiled a record of 3–3–2.

Schedule

References

Washington Agricultural
Washington State Cougars football seasons
Washington Agricultural football